Farida Bourquia (born 1948) is a Moroccan film director, "one of the first Moroccan women to make filmmaking a career both on the screen and in television".

Life
After studying drama in Moscow from 1968 to 1973, Bourquia taught dramatic arts at the Conservatory of Casablanca. For most of her career, she has worked for the public broadcaster, Radiodiffusion-Télévision Marocaine, making documentaries and children's programs.

For International Women's Year in 1975, Bourquia made several documentaries about Moroccan women - the first Moroccan documentaries to be entirely produced and directed by a woman. Her 1982 feature film The Embers told the story of three orphaned village children. Two Women on the Road (2007) was "a Moroccan version of the American classic female road movie, Thelma and Louise".

Filmography

Films made for television
 Le dernier aveu [The last promise]
 La bague [The ring]
 Je ne reviendrai pas [I will not come back]
 Le visage et le miroir [The face and the mirror]
 La boite magique [The magic box]
 La maison demandée [The popular house]

Feature films
 1982: La braise 
 2007: Deux femmes sur la route 
 2014: Zaynab, la rose d'Aghmat

References

External links
 

1948 births
Living people
Moroccan film directors